John Bosco Group of Colleges,  located in Tiruvallur, Tamil Nadu, India, is a group of colleges having many colleges in different streams.

References

External links
Official website

2000 establishments in Tamil Nadu
Educational institutions established in 2000
Colleges in Tamil Nadu
Education in Tiruvallur district